Richard Parkinson full name  Richard Heinrich Robert Parkinson (1844, Augustenburg, Alsen Island – 1909) was a Danish explorer and anthropologist.

Career
In 1875, he became a  representative of the Hamburg trading firm J. C Godeffroy & Sohn in Samoa. He was, in part, employed to collect ethnographic material for the Godeffroy Museum. He remained in Samoa until 1882, settling afterwards on the Gazelle Peninsula, New Britain. From there he undertook larger and smaller journeys to the Bismarck Archipelago, then the Solomon Islands and New Guinea.
He also collected zoological specimens, especially insects.

Thirty Years in the South Seas
His masterwork Dreißig Jahre in der Südsee, (Thirty years in the South Seas), appeared in several editions first in 1907 and again in 1911. It describes in detail the islands, Neulauenburg (Duke of York Islands), Neumecklenburg and New Hanover, St. Matthias Islands, the Admiralty Islands and Micronesian outliers in the Bismarck Sea, the German Solomon Islands, their societies, masks and mask dances, legends and fairy tales as well as the languages.

Works
 Im Bismarckarchipel.  Leipzig: Brockhaus 1887 (Repr. 2006 im Verlag Fines Mundi, Saarbrücken)
 Dreißig Jahre in der Südsee. Land und Leute, Sitten und Gebräuche im Bismarckarchipel und auf den deutschen Salomoinseln. Herausgegeben von Dr. B. Ankermann, Direktorial-Assistent am königlichen Museum für Völkerkunde zu Berlin. Strecker & Schröder, Stuttgart 1907 (Neuausgabe ebd. 1911; 2. Auflage bearbeitet und herausgegeben von Prof. Dr. August Eichhorn, ebd. 1926) 
 Aberglaube und Zauberwesen der Südseeinsulaner. Ensslin & Laiblin, Reutlingen [1932]

External links
 
 Katalog der Bibliothek der Deutschen Kolonialgesellschaft in der Stadt- und Universitatsbibliothek Frankfurt a.M.
 Kurzbiographie

Danish explorers
Danish entomologists
1844 births
1909 deaths
People from Augustenborg, Denmark
People from Sønderborg Municipality